Folgaria (Cimbrian: Folgrait, from the Latin filicaria) is a comune (municipality) in Trentino in the northern Italian region Trentino-Alto Adige/Südtirol, located about  southeast of Trento.

Geography

The comune territory borders the following municipalities: Caldonazzo, Centa San Nicolò, Besenello, Calliano, Lavarone, Lastebasse, Rovereto, Terragnolo and Laghi. It includes six main frazioni (Costa, Serrada, Guardia, Mezzomonte, San Sebastiano, Carbonare e Nosellari) and other of lesser size (Pont, Ondertol, Dori, Molino nuovo, Forreri, Ca nove, Molini, Peneri, Fontani, Scandelli, Sotto il soglio, Carpeneda, Mezzaselva, Erspameri, Francolini, Colpi, Nocchi, Perpruneri, Tezzeli, Morganti, Cùeli, Buse e Virti) in the valleys of Rio Cavallo and Astico.

It is a renowned ski resort, but it is also frequented in summer.

Points of interest
 Giardino Botanico Alpino di Passo Coe, an alpine nature preserve and botanical garden

Demographic evolution

References

Cities and towns in Trentino-Alto Adige/Südtirol